Amara Institute of Engineering and Technology (AIET) is a sprivate engineering college located in Andhra Pradesh, India.

References

Engineering colleges in Andhra Pradesh
Colleges in Guntur
2007 establishments in Andhra Pradesh
Educational institutions established in 2007